Jeannie Hakongak Ehaloak is a Canadian politician, who was elected to the Legislative Assembly of Nunavut in the 2017 general election. She represents the electoral district of Cambridge Bay.

Prior to her election to the legislature, Ehaloak served as mayor of Cambridge Bay.

References

Members of the Legislative Assembly of Nunavut
Women MLAs in Nunavut
Inuit politicians
Living people
Year of birth missing (living people)
21st-century Canadian politicians
Mayors of places in Nunavut
Women mayors of places in Nunavut
People from Cambridge Bay
Inuit from the Northwest Territories
Inuit from Nunavut
Members of the Executive Council of Nunavut
Women government ministers of Canada
Canadian Inuit women
21st-century Canadian women politicians